Tawhitia is a genus of moths of the family Crambidae.

Species
Tawhitia glaucophanes (Meyrick, 1907)
Tawhitia pentadactylus (Zeller, 1863)

References

Natural History Museum Lepidoptera genus database

Crambinae
Crambidae genera
Taxa named by Alfred Philpott